Firkin may refer to:
 Firkin (unit), small cask used for liquids, butter, salt, and sometimes fish:
 Firkin, a volume of beer; see English brewery cask units#Firkin
 Firkin Brewery, a chain of pubs in the United Kingdom
 Firkin Roos, an Australian rules football team in Britain; see Earls Court Kangaroos
 Firkin (aircraft), NATO reporting name for Su-47, a Russian experimental jet fighter